Kalateh-ye Tashi (also Romanized as Kalāteh-ye Tashī; also known as Moḩammadābād) is a village in Ghazi Rural District, Samalqan District, Maneh and Samalqan County, North Khorasan Province, Iran. At the 2006 census, its population was 264, in 64 families.

References 

Populated places in Maneh and Samalqan County